The Edward Hornblower House and Barn is a historic farmstead in Arlington, Massachusetts. The 2.5-story wood-frame house was built c. 1830, and was probably moved to its present location around 1850.  At that time it also received stylistic modifications, giving it a more Italianate appearance.  It was further modified in the 1870s, probably by financier Edward T. Hornblower, of the Boston brokerage firm Hornblower & Page (later Hornblower & Weeks) to add Renaissance Revival elements.  A barn, estimated to date to about 1805, stands behind the house.

The house and barn were listed on the National Register of Historic Places in 1985.

See also
National Register of Historic Places listings in Arlington, Massachusetts

References

Houses on the National Register of Historic Places in Arlington, Massachusetts
Houses in Arlington, Massachusetts
Houses completed in 1805
1805 establishments in Massachusetts